UTF-32 (32-bit Unicode Transformation Format) is a fixed-length encoding used to encode Unicode code points that uses exactly 32 bits (four bytes) per code point (but a number of leading bits must be zero as there are far fewer than 232 Unicode code points, needing actually only 21 bits). UTF-32 is a fixed-length encoding, in contrast to all other Unicode transformation formats, which are variable-length encodings. Each 32-bit value in UTF-32 represents one Unicode code point and is exactly equal to that code point's numerical value.

The main advantage of UTF-32 is that the Unicode code points are directly indexed. Finding the Nth code point in a sequence of code points is a constant-time operation. In contrast, a variable-length code requires linear-time to count N code points from the start of the string. This makes UTF-32 a simple replacement in code that uses integers that are incremented by one to examine each location in a string, as was commonly done for ASCII. However, Unicode code points are rarely processed in complete isolation, such as combining character sequences and for emoji.

The main disadvantage of UTF-32 is that it is space-inefficient, using four bytes per code point, including 11 bits that are always zero. Characters beyond the BMP are relatively rare in most texts (except for e.g. texts with some popular emojis), and can typically be ignored for sizing estimates. This makes UTF-32 close to twice the size of UTF-16. It can be up to four times the size of UTF-8 depending on how many of the characters are in the ASCII subset.

History 
The original ISO/IEC 10646 standard defines a 32-bit encoding form called UCS-4, in which each code point in the Universal Character Set (UCS) is represented by a 31-bit value from 0 to 0x7FFFFFFF (the sign bit was unused and zero). In November 2003, Unicode was restricted by RFC 3629 to match the constraints of the UTF-16 encoding: explicitly prohibiting code points greater than U+10FFFF (and also the high and low surrogates U+D800 through U+DFFF). This limited subset defines UTF-32. Although the ISO standard had (as of 1998 in Unicode 2.1) "reserved for private use" 0xE00000 to 0xFFFFFF, and 0x60000000 to 0x7FFFFFFF these areas were removed in later versions. Because the Principles and Procedures document of ISO/IEC JTC 1/SC 2 Working Group 2 states that all future assignments of code points will be constrained to the Unicode range, UTF-32 will be able to represent all UCS code points and UTF-32 and UCS-4 are identical.

Analysis 
Though a fixed number of bytes per code point seems convenient, it is not as useful as it appears. It makes truncation easier but not significantly so compared to UTF-8 and UTF-16 (both of which can search backwards for the point to truncate by looking at 2–4 code units at most).

It is extremely rare that code wishes to find the Nth character in a string without first having to calculate N by examining all the characters between this position and one end of the string. For instance any LALR parser (such as for XML) needs to look at all the previous code points before being able to do anything with the Nth code point. An integer index that is incremented by 1 for each character can be replaced with an integer offset, measured in code units and incremented by the number of code units as each character is examined. This removes any speed advantage of UTF-32.

Even with a "fixed width" font finding the string width from a count of code points is impossible. There are combining forms like 'é' as expressed using two code points 'e' + ' ́ ' (and multi-code-point emoji, due to emoji modifiers and emoji zero-width joiner sequences, for instance both of these Emoji are 3 code points: "👨‍🦲 Man: Bald" and "👩‍🦰 Woman: Red Hair".). Also "fixed width" may assign a width of 2 to CJK ideographs, and some code points take multiple character positions per code point ("grapheme clusters" for CJK).

Use 
The main use of UTF-32 is in internal APIs where the data is single code points or glyphs, rather than strings of characters. For instance, in modern text rendering, it is common that the last step is to build a list of structures each containing coordinates (x,y), attributes, and a single UTF-32 code point identifying the glyph to draw. Often non-Unicode information is stored in the "unused" 11 bits of each word.

Use of UTF-32 strings on Windows (where  is 16 bits) is almost non-existent. On Unix systems, UTF-32 strings are sometimes, but rarely, used internally by applications, due to the type  being defined as 32 bit. Python versions up to 3.2 can be compiled to use them instead of UTF-16; from version 3.3 onward all Unicode strings are stored in UTF-32 but with leading zero bytes optimized away "depending on the [code point] with the largest Unicode ordinal (1, 2, or 4 bytes)" to make all code points that size. Seed7 and Lasso programming languages encode all strings with UTF-32, in the belief that direct indexing is important, whereas the Julia programming language moved away from builtin UTF-32 support with its 1.0 release, simplifying the language to having only UTF-8 strings (with all the other encodings considered legacy and moved out of the standard library to package) following the "UTF-8 Everywhere Manifesto".

Variants 
Though technically invalid, the surrogate halves are often encoded and allowed. This allows invalid UTF-16 (such as Windows filenames) to be translated to UTF-32, similar to how the WTF-8 variant of UTF-8 works. Sometimes paired surrogates are encoded instead of non-BMP characters, similar to CESU-8. Due to the large number of unused 32-bit values, it is also possible to preserve invalid UTF-8 by using non-Unicode values to encode UTF-8 errors, though there is no standard for this.

See also 
 Comparison of Unicode encodings

Notes

References

External links 
 The Unicode Standard 5.0.0, chapter 3 formally defines UTF-32 in § 3.9, D90 (PDF page 40) and § 3.10, D99-D101 (PDF page 45)
 Unicode Standard Annex #19 formally defined UTF-32 for Unicode 3.x (March 2001; last updated March 2002)
 Registration of new charsets: UTF-32, UTF-32BE, UTF-32LE announcement of UTF-32 being added to the IANA charset registry (April 2002)

Character encoding
Unicode Transformation Formats